Richard D. Kahlenberg (born June 8, 1963) is an American writer who has written about a variety of education, labor and housing issues.

An education and housing policy consultant, he is also a senior fellow at the Progressive Policy Institute, a nonresident scholar at Georgetown University's McCourt School of Public Policy, and a professorial lecturer at George Washington University's Trachtenberg School of Public Policy and Public Administration.

The author or editor of 18 books, he has been called “the intellectual father of the economic integration movement”  in K–12 schooling and “arguably the nation’s chief proponent of class-based affirmative action in higher education admissions.” He is also an authority on housing segregation, teachers’ unions, charter schools, community colleges, and labor organizing.

The New York Times called Kahlenberg “the most prominent self-described progressive with doubts about the current version of affirmative action.”   In a magazine profile, The New Republic called him an “affirmative action prophet” for toiling away for decades in support of class-based affirmative action, an idea that was “a heresy” among liberals but is likely to become a key path forward for promoting racial diversity.  Kahlenberg's 1996 book The Remedy: Class, Race and Affirmative Action  was named one of the best books of the year by The Washington Post.  William Julius Wilson's review in The New York Times called it “by far the most comprehensive and thoughtful account thus far for...affirmative action based on class.” 

Kahlenberg won the William A. Kaplin Award for Excellence in Higher Education Law and Policy Scholarship for his research on ways selective colleges can open the doors to more economically disadvantaged students.   William G. Bowen and Michael S. McPherson wrote that he “deserves more credit than anyone else for arguing vigorously and relentlessly for stronger efforts to address disparities by socioeconomic status.”  He served as an expert witness to the plaintiffs in Students for Fair Admissions v. Harvard and Students for Fair Admissions v. University of North Carolina.

Kahlenberg graduated magna cum laude from Harvard College in 1985 and cum laude from Harvard Law School in 1989. Between college and law school, he spent a year in Kenya at the University of Nairobi School of Journalism, as a Rotary Scholar.

Kahlenberg has been a Senior Fellow at The Century Foundation, a Fellow at the Center for National Policy, a visiting associate professor of constitutional law at George Washington University, and a legislative assistant to Senator Charles S. Robb (D-VA). He is serves on the advisory board of the Pell Institute and the Albert Shanker Institute.

Works
Excluded: How Snob Zoning, NIMBYism, and Class Bias Build the Walls We Don't See (PublicAffairs Press, 2023);
A Smarter Charter: Finding What Works for Charter Schools and Public Education (with Halley Potter) (Teachers College Press, 2014); 
Why Labor Organizing Should Be a Civil Right: Rebuilding a Middle-Class Democracy by Enhancing Worker Voice (with Moshe Marvit) (Century Foundation Press, 2012); 
Tough Liberal: Albert Shanker and the Battles Over Schools, Unions, Race and Democracy (Columbia University Press, 2007); 
All Together Now: Creating Middle Class Schools through Public School Choice (Brookings Institution Press, 2001);
 The Remedy: Class, Race, and Affirmative Action (Basic Books, 1996); and 
Broken Contract: A Memoir of Harvard Law School (Hill & Wang/Farrar, Straus & Giroux, 1992.)

Edited Volumes 
Restoring the American Dream: Providing Community Colleges with the Resources They Need – The Report of the Working Group on Community College Financial Resources (Executive Director) (2019)
The Future of Affirmative Action: New Paths to Higher Education Diversity after Fisher v. University of Texas (2014)
 Bridging the Higher Education Divide: Strengthening Community Colleges and Restoring the American Dream, Chaired by Anthony Marx and Eduardo Padron (Executive Director) (2013);
The Future of School Integration: Socioeconomic Diversity as an Education Reform Strategy (2012); 
Affirmative Action for the Rich: Legacy Preferences in College Admissions (2010); 
Rewarding Strivers: Helping Low-Income Students Succeed in College (2010); 
Improving on No Child Left Behind: Getting Education Reform Back on Track (2008); 
America's Untapped Resource: Low-Income Students in Higher Education (2004); 
Public School Choice vs. Private School Vouchers (2003);
 Divided We Fail: Coming Together Through Public School Choice.  The Report of The Century Foundation Task Force on the Common School, Chaired by Lowell Weicker (Executive Director) (2002);
 A Notion at Risk: Preserving Public Education as an Engine for Social Mobility (2000).

Kahlenberg's articles have been published in The New York Times, The Washington Post, The Wall Street Journal, The Economist and The New Republic and he has appeared on ABC, CBS, CNN, FOX, C-SPAN, MSNBC, and NPR.

See also
 Affirmative action in the United States
 Albert Shanker
 Labour movement
 New York City teachers' strike of 1968
 Progressivism in the United States

References

External links 
 Biography and Publications on The Century Foundation Website
 

1963 births
Living people
American writers
Harvard Law School alumni
Harvard College alumni
Opposition to affirmative action
Affirmative action in the United States